The 2007 German Open Grand Prix (officially known as the Yonex German Open 2007 for sponsorship reasons) was a badminton tournament which took place in Mülheim from 27 February to 4 March 2007. It had a total purse of $80,000.

Tournament 
The 2007 German Open Grand Prix was the inaugural tournament of the 2007 BWF Grand Prix Gold and Grand Prix and also part of the German Open championships which has been held since 1955. This tournament was organized by the German Badminton Association and sanctioned by the BWF.

Venue 
This international tournament was held at Innogy Sporthalle in Mülheim, Germany.

Point distribution 
Below is the point distribution for each phase of the tournament based on the BWF points system for the BWF Grand Prix event.

Prize money 
The total prize money for this tournament was US$80,000. Distribution of prize money was in accordance with BWF regulations.

Men's singles

Seeds 

 Lin Dan (champion)
 Chen Yu (final)
 Lee Tsuen Seng (third round)
 Przemysław Wacha (third round)
 Sairul Amar Ayob (first round)
 Björn Joppien (second round)
 Ng Wei (second round)
 Joachim Persson (quarter-finals)
 Chetan Anand (first round)
 Chan Yan Kit (third round)
 Andrew Dabeka (first round)
 Roslin Hashim (third round)
 Kendrick Lee Yen Hui (third round)
 John Moody (second round)
 Kasper Ødum (third round)
 Park Sung-hwan (quarter-finals)

Finals

Top half

Section 1

Section 2

Bottom half

Section 3

Section 4

Women's singles

Seeds 

 Xie Xingfang (champion)
 Huaiwen Xu (final)
 Petya Nedelcheva (semi-finals)
 Pi Hongyan (semi-finals)
 Huang Chia-chi (quarter-finals)
 Susan Hughes (second round)
 Hwang Hye-youn (quarter-finals)
 Tine Rasmussen (withdrew)

Finals

Top half

Section 1

Section 2

Bottom half

Section 3

Section 4

Men's doubles

Seeds 

 Jung Jae-sung / Lee Yong-dae (final)
 Albertus Susanto Njoto / Yohan Hadikusumo Wiratama (semi-finals)
 Ashley Brehaut / Aji Basuki Sindoro (withdrew)
 Roman Spitko / Michael Fuchs (first round)
 Guo Zhendong / He Hanbin (second round)
 Lee Jae-jin / Hwang Ji-man (champions)
 Sigit Budiarto / Fran Kurniawan (semi-finals)
  Shen Ye / Xu Chen (second round)

Finals

Top half

Section 1

Section 2

Bottom half

Section 3

Section 4

Women's doubles

Seeds 

 Yang Wei / Zhang Jiewen (champions)
 Du Jing / Yu Yang (final)
 Petya Nedelcheva / Diana Dimova (first round)
 Lee Kyung-won / Lee Hyo-jung (semi-finals)
 Hwang Yu-mi / Kim Min-jung (semi-finals)
 Joanne Nicholas / Natalie Munt (second round)
 Tian Qing / Pan Pan (quarter-finals)
 Lim Pek Siah / Joanne Quay (second round)

Finals

Top half

Section 1

Section 2

Bottom half

Section 3

Section 4

Mixed doubles

Seeds 

 Nathan Robertson / Gail Emms (quarter-finals)
 Svetoslav Stoyanov / Élodie Eymard (second round)
 Daniel Shirley /  Joanne Quay (quarter-finals)
 Ingo Kindervater / Kathrin Piotrowski (quarter-finals)
 Xu Chen / Zhao Tingting (final)
 Zheng Bo / Gao Ling (champions)
 He Hanbin / Yu Yang (second round)
 Lee Yong-dae / Lee Hyo-jung (semi-finals)

Finals

Top half

Section 1

Section 2

Bottom half

Section 3

Section 4

References

External links 
Official website
Tournament Link

German Open (badminton)
German Open
Open